Alksnėnai is a village in Kėdainiai district municipality, in Kaunas County, in central Lithuania. According to the 2011 census, the village has a population of 113 people. It is located by the Kruostas river. There is a former school.

During Soviet era Alksnėnai was a subsidiary settlement of the "Nemunas" kolkhoz.

Demography

Gallery

References

Villages in Kaunas County
Kėdainiai District Municipality